Aaron Ashby (born May 24, 1998) is an American professional baseball pitcher for the Milwaukee Brewers of Major League Baseball (MLB). He was drafted by the Brewers in the 4th round of the 2018 Major League Baseball draft.

Career
Ashby was drafted by the Milwaukee Brewers out of Crowder College in the 4th round, 125th overall, of the 2018 Major League Baseball draft. 

He made his professional debut with the Rookie-level Helena Brewers, and also played for the Single-A Wisconsin Timber Rattlers, posting a cumulative 2–3 record and 3.59 ERA in 13 games. In 2019, Ashby split the season between Wisconsin and the High-A Carolina Mudcats, logging a 5–10 record and 3.50 ERA in 24 appearances between the two teams. 

Ashby did not play in a game in 2020 due to the cancellation of the minor league season because of the COVID-19 pandemic. He was assigned to the Triple-A Nashville Sounds to begin the 2021 season. Ashby was shifted to the bullpen in June, and recorded a 4–1 record and 4.50 ERA in 12 games for the team.

On June 29, 2021, the Brewers announced that they would promote Ashby to the major leagues for the first time. He was formally selected to the 40-man and active rosters the on June 30. He made his MLB debut that day as the starting pitcher against the Chicago Cubs. In his debut, he went  of an inning and allowed 7 runs, 4 earned. At the end of his 1st season, he played in 13 games, 4 in which he started, and he put up a record of 3–2, with an ERA of 4.55 and 39 strikeouts in 31.2 innings.

On July 23, 2022, the Brewers and Ashby agreed on 5-year deal that will keep him under contract through the 2027 season, with club options for 2028 and 2029. 

On February 16, 2023, it was announced that Ashby would miss “a couple of months” with left shoulder inflammation.

Personal life

Aaron is the nephew of former MLB pitcher Andy Ashby.

References

External links

1998 births
Living people
Baseball players from Kansas City, Missouri
Major League Baseball pitchers
Milwaukee Brewers players
Helena Brewers players
Wisconsin Timber Rattlers players
Carolina Mudcats players
Nashville Sounds players